Hainan Normal University is the province's oldest institution for higher learning and located in Haikou city, Hainan, China. Over 20,000 students are enrolled, including about 200 foreigners.

The 3,347 sq. metre campus is also home to The Secondary School Teacher’s Continuation Education Centre of Hainan and the Training Centre for Higher Learning Institution are also located on the campus.

In 2008, a new campus opened in Guilinyang Town, several kilometres southeast of Haikou.

Faculty
800 full-time teachers
92 professors
214 associate professors

Departments and programs

15 departments
18 research institutions
17 graduate programs
36 undergraduate programs
2 provincial key laboratories

See also
List of universities and colleges in Hainan
List of universities in China
Higher education in China

References

External links
 
Hainan Normal University (Chinese Version)
Hainan Normal University (English Version)

Universities and colleges in Hainan
Teachers colleges in China
Educational institutions established in 1949
Organizations based in Haikou
1949 establishments in China